Siddhasēna Divākara was a jain monk in the fifth century CE who wrote works on Jain philosophy and epistemology. He was like the illuminator of the Jain order and therefore came to be known as Divākara, "Sun". He is credited with the authorship of many books, most of which are not available. Sanmatitarka (‘The Logic of the True Doctrine’) is the first major Jain work on logic written in Sanskrit.

Life
Siddhasena Divakara is said to have lived in fourth or fifth century CE. He was a Brahmin by birth and a scholar. He was initiated by Acharya Vruddhavadi. According to the tradition, Siddhasena Divakara once planned to translate all the Jaina works from prakrit to Sanskrit. He was asked by his master to visit all the Jain temples as a punishment. He thus visited the Jain temples for twelve years. He then came upon a Linga temple in Ujjain. He slept at the temple with his feet towards the Linga, which is a symbol of Shiva. King Vikramaditya had him beaten for the sin on request of the devotees. However, with miraculous powers, Siddhasena Divakara made that the King's wife receive the beating instead of him, looking at his miraculous powers  he was then set free.
King Vikramaditya requested Siddhasena ji not to sleep in front of the Linga and should start worshipping him, Siddhasenaji replied to the king's request stating that the Linga would not be able to handle his devotion and bhakti, thus he then started to praise the lord by residing his composition "The Kalyan Mandir Stotra" as he reached the 11th verse, the sky rumbled, the temple bells started ringing and the Linga opened thus emerging the idol of Avanti Parshwanath ji from within.
It is believed that the idol of Avanti Parshvanath ji was created and worshipped by Maha Kaal himself.

Thought
Siddhasena's main contribution in the Sanmatitarka is his analysis of the Jain theory of Anekantavada. According to Jeffery Long, Siddhasena divides the seven classical Jain nayas (standpoints, viewpoints) into two categories: "those which affirm the substantiality of existence (dravyāstikanayas) and those which affirm the impermanent, changing aspects of existence (paryāyāstikanayas)." This view sees the best account of reality as one which includes permanence and impermanence, identity and difference in a complex set of contradictory relations. Siddhasena also argued that the number of possible nayas or viewpoints of reality is potentially limitless. He then goes on to correlate each of the nayas with the positions of Indian philosophical schools, showing how each view is not only partial but also one sided.

Works
He was the author of Sammati-tarka-prakarana and is said to have written the Nyāyāvatāra, Sanmati sutra and Kalyan Mandir stotra.

References

Citations

Sources

 
 
 
 
 Shri Abhidhan Rajendra Kosh Vol 5, written by Acharya Rajendrasuri (1827–1906)
 
 

Jain acharyas
Siddhasen Diwakar
Year of death unknown
Year of birth unknown
Indian Jain monks
5th-century Indian Jains
5th-century Jain monks
5th-century Indian monks